Abe Brown or Abraham Brown or variant, may refer to:
Abe Brown (Marvel Comics) or Abraham Brown, a martial artist in the Marvel Universe
President Abraham Brown, a fictional president of the United States
Young Brown, or Abe Brown (born September 24, 1893, date of death unknown), was a welterweight boxer from New York City
Barnacle Bill (song), a song originating as the folk song "Abraham Brown"
 Abraham Browne House, colonial era house in Watertown, Massachusetts, USA

See also
 Abe (disambiguation)
 Brown (disambiguation)